The Receiver, formally called The Receiver for the Metropolitan Police District (and sometimes referred to early in the post's existence as the Receiver-General), was until 2000 the chief financial officer of the Metropolitan Police in London, the Treasurer of the Metropolitan Police Fund. He was always a civilian, not a police officer.

The Receiver's title came from the fact that his original role was to 'receive' money raised from the rates of the Metropolitan Police District's parishes.

The Receiver was appointed by the Crown. All the property of the Metropolitan Police was technically owned by the holder of the post of Receiver, who had the legal status of a corporation sole. All contracts were made in his name and all purchases, sales and contracts required his approval. He had equal status with the Commissioners. This had the advantage that the police, holding no property themselves, were protected from accusations of corruption. In 1839, the Receiver also became responsible for the administration of the police courts.

The system started to break down after the retirement of the first Receiver, John Wray, in 1860. Wray had worked well with the Commissioners, but his successors had increasingly bad relations with them, despite the Metropolitan Police Act 1861 further codifying the role of Receiver. This came to a head under Commissioner Sir Charles Warren, a soldier who was accustomed to exercising full authority, and intensely disliked having to clear every decision with a bureaucrat who had equal standing to himself. Conflict continued sporadically until 1968, when it was finally decided to make the Receiver and the Receiver's Department subordinate to the Commissioner. From then on, the Receiver was considered equal in rank to the Deputy Commissioner.

By the end of the 20th century, the Receiver also held the title of Director of Finance and had become responsible for the Finance, Property Services, and Technology Departments of the force. With the consent of the Home Secretary, he could issue precepts on the local authorities within the Metropolitan Police District in order to finance the force. He also had responsibility for the finance, and some other services, of the Inner London Magistrates' Court Service and the Inner London Probation Service.

In July 2000, with the introduction of the Metropolitan Police Authority and the removal of responsibility for the Metropolitan Police from the Home Secretary, the post of Receiver was abolished and replaced with a Director of Resources. Keith Luck was the first person to hold the new post, from 2000 to 2006. The Director of Resources from June 2007 has been Anne McMeel.

Receivers
John Wray, 1829–1860
Maurice Drummond, 1860–1883
Sir Richard Pennefather, 1883–1909
George Tripp, 1910–1919
Sir John Moylan, 1919–1942
Sir Frederic Johnson, 1942–1952
Sir Joseph Baker, 1952–1960
William Cornish, 1961–1967
Kenneth Parker, 1967–1974
Ronald Guppy, 1974–1976
Richard James, 1977–1980
Alexander Gordon-Brown, 1980–1987
David Hilary, 1987–1992
Graham Angel, 1992–1996
Philip Fletcher, 1996–2000

References

Receiver
Civil service positions in the United Kingdom